Asthma UK  is a British charity based in London.

History
The Asthma Research Council was started in 1927.  At that time the annual income was between £1,000 and £4,000 a year. One of the first donations was used to pay for special asthma clinics at Guy's Hospital and Great Ormond Street Hospital. In 1989 it became the National Asthma Campaign and in 2004, when support for people with asthma had become more important, it changed its name to Asthma UK.

In 2020 Asthma UK merged with the British Lung Foundation to become the Asthma UK and British Lung Foundation Partnership.

Activity
It established a new Centre for Applied Research in asthma at University of Edinburgh in 2014. It consists of a network of  academics and partners, working collaboratively to improve treatment and care for people living with asthma  

In January 2017 it published the results of a survey of 4,650 patients showing that about 3.6 million people across the UK were not getting adequate routine care for their asthma.  This should include an appropriate annual asthma review (more often for severe cases and children), the right medication and knowing how to use it, and a written asthma action plan.  In a further report published in August 2019 they showed that only 18% of patients with severe asthma — those prescribed high-dose inhaled corticosteroids — were referred to asthma specialists in secondary care.

Fundraising
Asthma UK is mainly funded by voluntary donations (43%) and donations in legacies and wills (38%), while the rest is made up of corporate and trust donations (13%), income from investments (4%), and grants (2%).

Chris Tarrant, who has asthma, presented an appeal for the charity in 2013 on BBC television.

References

External links
Asthma UK Website

Asthma organizations
Health charities in the United Kingdom
Organisations based in the City of London